Zinc finger CCCH-type containing 12A is a protein in humans that is encoded by the ZC3H12A gene.

ZC3H12A is an MCP1 (CCL2; MIM 158105)-induced protein that acts as a transcriptional activator and causes cell death of cardiomyocytes, possibly via induction of genes associated with apoptosis.

References

Further reading 

 

Genes on human chromosome 1